Jedlinka is a village and small municipality in Bardejov District in the Prešov Region of north-east Slovakia.

History 
In historical records the village was first mentioned in 1567.

Geography 
The municipality lies at an altitude of 405 metres and covers an area of 4.56 km2.
It has a population of about 82 people.

Genealogical resources

The records for genealogical research are available at the state archive "Statny Archiv in Presov, Slovakia"

 Roman Catholic church records (births/marriages/deaths): 1695-1895 (parish B)
 Greek Catholic church records (births/marriages/deaths): 1798-1895 (parish B)

See also
 List of municipalities and towns in Slovakia

References

External links 
 
 
https://web.archive.org/web/20070513023228/http://www.statistics.sk/mosmis/eng/run.html
Surnames of living people in Jedlinka

Villages and municipalities in Bardejov District
Šariš